Tomopleura coffea is a species of sea snail, a marine gastropod mollusk in the family Borsoniidae.

Description
The length of the shell varies between 10 mm and 25 mm.

Distribution
This marine species occurs off the Philippines.

References

 Thiele, 1925. Deutschen Tiefsee-Expedition auf dem Dampfer Valdivia 1898–1899

External links
 

coffea
Gastropods described in 1925